Patrick Maccari (born 14 October 1951) is a French retired slalom canoeist who competed in the 1960s and the 1970s. He won a gold medal in the K-1 team event at the 1969 ICF Canoe Slalom World Championships in Bourg St.-Maurice.

Maccari also finished 11th in the K-1 event at the 1972 Summer Olympics in Munich.

External links

1951 births
Canoeists at the 1972 Summer Olympics
French male canoeists
Living people
Olympic canoeists of France
Medalists at the ICF Canoe Slalom World Championships